Cade Klubnik (born October 10, 2003) is an American football quarterback for the Clemson Tigers.

High school career
Klubnik attended Westlake High School in Austin, Texas. During his high school career he passed for 7,426 yards with 86 touchdowns and seven interceptions and won three state championships. In summer 2021 before his senior year, he was named the MVP of the Elite 11. As a senior he was named the All-American Bowl Player of the Year, MaxPreps Player of the Year and was the Gatorade Football Player of the Year for Texas.

A five-star recruit, Klubnik was rated as the top quarterback in his class and committed to Clemson University to play college football.

College career
Klubnik enrolled early at Clemson in January 2022.

Throughout Klubnik's freshman season, he was used primarily as a backup to DJ Uiagalelei. During Clemson's opening game against Georgia Tech in 2022, Klubnik passed for 49 yards and a touchdown. He saw significant action in relief of a benched Uiagalelei against Syracuse, a game which Clemson won narrowly in a 27–21 comeback.

In the ACC Championship Game, he got the starting nod over Uiagalelei. He passed for 279 yards and a touchdown in the 39–10 win over North Carolina. He was their starter in the 2022 Orange Bowl against Tennessee due to Uiagalelei entering the transfer portal. Klubnik had to deal with constant pressure from Tennessee. Despite the pressure, he helped lead Clemson to numerous scoring opportunities that did not result in points. He got sacked four times and threw two interceptions to go along with 320 passing yards. Tennessee dominated the 2022 Orange Bowl, winning 31-14.

References

External links
Clemson Tigers bio

2003 births
Living people
Players of American football from Austin, Texas
American football quarterbacks
Clemson Tigers football players